Priyanka Deshpande (born 28 April 1992) is an Indian television presenter, host and actress. She predominantly works in Tamil television and film industry especially in Tamil entertainment, Priyanka is also one of the highest paid South Indian television presenters in the industry. She is very well known for hosting numerous television shows such as Oo Solriya Oo Oohm Solriya, Super Singer Junior, Super Singer (Tamil reality show), The Wall (Tamil game show), Start music, OlliBelly, Suriya Vanakkam, Isai Unplugged, Azhagiya Penne, Glimpse, Jodi Number One and Kings of Comedy Juniors. She has also appeared in a few short films such as Raani Aattam (2015) and Unnodu Vaazhnthaal Varamallava (2016). Priyanka has also worked as a television host in various different Indian television networks like Zee Tamil, Sun TV, Chutti TV, Sun Music and Star Vijay. She is often referred to as Superstar of Television.

Her appearance as an television anchor in the singing reality show Super Singer (Tamil reality show) earned her to bag the Ananda Vikatan Cinema Awards for the Best Female Anchor in 2016. She later also won the Best Female Anchor award in the Vijay Television Awards annual function in 2017. Priyanka also yet again won Best Lady Anchor for the third time in a row in the Galatta Nakshathra TV-Film Awards in 2018, winning the same nomination category for three years in a row. She also received the award Best Entertaining Star award by Blacksheep Digital Awards in 2021 after her success of her YouTube channel. In 2021, She joined the reality TV show Bigg Boss Tamil 5 hosted by Kamal Haasan as a contestant and finished as the first runner up.

Her estimated total earnings exceed US$1.16 million. While some sources consider her net worth to be around as high as US$1.62 million as of late 2020.

Personal life 
Priyanka Deshpande was born on 28 April 1990 in Karnataka. Her parents moved from Maharashtra to Karnataka before she was born. She also has a younger brother called Rohit Deshpande. After Priyanka migrated to Chennai she did her secondary schooling at St. Anthony School and later graduated from Ethiraj College for Women with a college degree. Priyanka married her long-term boyfriend Praveen Kumar in 2016.

In 2022 reports alleged Priyanka and her husband Praveen Kumar had divorced. Priyanka later dismissed it as a baseless rumour.

Career 
Priyanka started her career in 2009 with the channel Zee Tamil hosting the shows This Chirpy girl, Azhagiya Penne and Isai Unplugged. She later went on the join Sun TV and hosted several of shows for four years straight. Priyanka was later approached by the creators of Star Vijay in 2015 and hosted the show Cinema Karam Coffee, alongside co-anchor Ma Ka Pa Anand; her sense of humour poured her with fame and success in the show, cementing her career therein. Priyanka went on to host many more successful shows on Star Vijay especially Super Singer (Tamil reality show). Priyanka also went on to make her debut as a judge in the program Kalakka Povathu Yaaru along with other veteran comedians Vaiyapuri and Aarthi.

In 2019, Priyanka started her own show on Star Vijay called Start Music which only featured her as the solo host for the show after eight years. Priyanka also debuted as an actress in various different short films like Raani Aattam Directed by J. Dharmendra and Unnodu Vaazhnthaal Varamallava, both films were paired up with film actor Vignesh Karthick. She also went on to appear in various different television commercials for Amazon Prime and Aachi Masala. Priyanka also appeared in the music video So Soku with Pugazh which was also trending on social media.

Priyanka also hosted the international reality show The Wall (Tamil game show) along with Ma Ka Pa Anand. Lyricist Yugabharathi approached Priyanka and convinced her to make her debut as a playback singer in the film Devarattam  for the song "Madura Palapalakkudhu", she later approved the offer and sang the song with co singers Nivas K. Prasanna, Vijay Sethupathi and Niranjana Ramanan. Since 2014, Priyanka has been hosting the annual function and award ceremony of Vijay Television Awards. Priyanka also received the award Best Entertaining Star award by Blacksheep Digital Awards in 2021 after her success of her YouTube channel. She was also nominated for Best Actress by Femina Super Daughter Award.

In 2021, Priyanka joined the reality show Bigg Boss (Tamil season 5) as a contestant which is hosted by actor Kamal Haasan and finished as the first runner up.

As of 2021, Priyanka is one of the highest paid South Indian television anchors, with her net worth and total estimated earnings exceeding US$1.16 million dollars. While some sources consider her net worth to be around as high as US$1.62 million dollars, this claim makes her one of the most richest television personalities in India. Apart from hosting TV shows, Priyanka also has a YouTube channel where she entertains people in virtual coverage, with her channel currently boasting 1.38M subscribers.

Success after Bigg Boss
After her participation on Bigg Boss and eventually emerging as the runner-up as well. Priyanka announced on the Instagram feed that she received more than 10 offers from various different television networks to host different shows on different television channels. She also participated as a guest on her formerly hosted show Start Music which was hosted by Ma Ka Pa Anand due to the absence of Priyanka during her time in Bigg Boss. She also later made a appearance on the celebration and success show of Bigg Boss called Bigg Boss 5 Kondattam appearing as a guest.

Television

Filmography
Short Films

Discography

Playback singer

Awards and nominations

References

External links

1990 births
Indian television presenters
Living people
21st-century Indian actresses
Indian women television presenters
Tamil television presenters
Indian women playback singers
Bigg Boss (Tamil TV series) contestants
Ethiraj College for Women alumni